Angela Hamblin (born September 30, 1976) is a former professional basketball player for the Detroit Shock of the WNBA.

References

External links
SHOCK: Angela Hamblin

1976 births
Living people
African-American basketball players
American women's basketball players
Basketball players from Gary, Indiana
Detroit Shock players
Guards (basketball)
Iowa Hawkeyes women's basketball players
Washington Mystics draft picks
21st-century African-American sportspeople
21st-century African-American women
20th-century African-American sportspeople
20th-century African-American women